Gayatri Saraf (born 17 August 1952) is an Indian writer.

Awards 
 Sahitya Akademi Award, 2017

References

1952 births
Living people
Women writers from Odisha
Odia-language writers
Recipients of the Sahitya Akademi Award in Odia